Alexandrovka is a rural locality (a selo) and the administrative center of Alexandrovskoye Rural Settlement, Verkhnekhavsky District, Voronezh Oblast, Russia. The population was 285 as of 2010. There are 2 streets.

Geography 
Alexandrovka is located 35 km east of Verkhnyaya Khava (the district's administrative centre) by road. Mitrofanovka is the nearest rural locality.

References 

Rural localities in Verkhnekhavsky District